Odonthalitus bisetanus is a species of moth of the family Tortricidae. It is found in Oaxaca, Mexico.

The length of the forewings is 7 mm. The forewings are pale tan and the hindwings are pale cream with pale grey-brown mottling.

Etymology
The species name refers to the two setae at the base of the valva.

References

Moths described in 2000
Euliini